Sculptiferussacia clausiliaeformis is a species of land snail in the family Ferussaciidae. It is endemic to the Canary Islands, where it is found only on Jandía, a peninsula on the island of Fuerteventura.

This snail is found at five sites high on the slopes of mountains. Its total range is less than 20 square kilometers. The habitat is located on steep mountain cliffs and is an area of high rainfall. It is threatened by grazing goats and by the creation of hiking trails for tourists.
Endemic fauna of the Canary Islands

References

External links
 Ibáñez, M. & M. R. Alonso. Sculptiferussacia clausiliaeformis Alonso e Ibáñez, 1992. Inventarios Nacionales. Ministerio de Agricultura, Alimentación y Medio Ambiente. Gobierno de España.

Ferussaciidae
Molluscs of the Canary Islands
Gastropods described in 1992
Taxonomy articles created by Polbot
Taxobox binomials not recognized by IUCN